The Great Britain Billie Jean King Cup team represents the United Kingdom in Fed Cup tennis competition and are governed by the Lawn Tennis Association.  In 2020, they lost out on a chance to secure a place at the inaugural Billie Jean King Cup finals, losing to Slovakia 3-1. However, in 2021 they won their play-off against Mexico and will play for another chance to enter the finals in 2022.

History
Great Britain competed in the first Fed Cup in 1963.  They have reached the finals on five occasions, 1967, 1971, 1972, 1981 and 2022. Great Britain is one of only four nations to have participated every year since the tournament's inception.

Inaugural team
Ann Jones
Christine Truman Janes
Deidre Catt

Players

Current squad
Rankings as of 11 November 2022

Recent call-ups
Rankings as of April 2022

Team performances

2020s

2010s

Earlier Years

1963–1969

1970–1979

1980–1989

1990–1999
Qualifying rounds were introduced from 1992, World Group II and World Group II Play-offs were introduced from 1995

2000–2009

See also
Billie Jean King Cup
Great Britain Davis Cup team

References

External links

Billie Jean King Cup teams
Fed Cup
Women's tennis in the United Kingdom